Tavernier may refer to:

 Tavernier (surname)
 Tavernier, Florida, United States of America
 Tavernier Blue, the precursor diamond to the Blue Diamond of the French Crown
 Tavernier River, a tributary of the Mégiscane River in Senneterre, Quebec, Canada

See also
 Taverner (disambiguation)
 Taverniera, a genus of legume